Jean-Claude Bras (born 15 November 1945) is a French former professional footballer who played as a striker and right winger. After his footballing career, he acted as the president of Red Star for 23 years.

After football 
In 1978, Bras retired from football. The same year, he became the president of his former club Red Star, a role in which he stayed in until 2001, 23 years later. In his lifetime, he would also become an entrepreneur for a building business, and later, an international commerce company.

Honours 
Paris Saint-Germain

 Division 2: 1970–71

References

External links
 
 
 

1945 births
Living people
French footballers
Association football forwards
France international footballers
Red Star F.C. players
Valenciennes FC players
RFC Liège players
Paris Saint-Germain F.C. players
Paris FC players
Ligue 1 players
Belgian Pro League players
Ligue 2 players
French expatriate footballers
Expatriate footballers in Belgium
French expatriate sportspeople in Belgium
French football chairmen and investors